Robert de Almendra Freitas 16 November 1947 – 5 April 2021) was a Brazilian doctor and politician.

Biography
He served in the Legislative Assembly of Piauí for the Democrats from 1987 to 2003, being re-elected in 1990, 1994, and 1998. However, he was impeached and forced to leave office in 2010.

Robert de Almendra Freitas died of COVID-19 in Teresina on 5 April 2021, at the age of 73.

References

1947 births
2021 deaths
Brazilian orthopaedic surgeons
Members of the Legislative Assembly of Piauí
Mayors of places in Brazil
Democrats (Brazil) politicians
Brazilian Social Democracy Party politicians
People from Piauí
Deaths from the COVID-19 pandemic in Piauí